"Forgiving" is episode 17 of season 3 in the television show Angel.

Plot synopsis
Shortly after Daniel Holtz's abduction of baby Connor to the Hell dimension of Quor'Toth, Fred, Gunn and Lorne try to sort out why Wesley betrayed them and how to get Connor back.

Angel is not interested in sympathy or pity, however, and is already mentally unstable and vengeful due to his loss, in behaviors that akin to that of his soulless alter-ego Angelus and Holtz's. When it proves impossible to open a portal to Quor'Toth, he abducts Linwood, a lawyer with Wolfram & Hart, to force him to tell where Sahjhan is and how to open a dimensional rift to Quor'Toth.  In an attempt to open a rift, Angel and Lilah use dark magic; this opens a tear in the fabric of reality.

Sahjhan is revealed to have been a demon knight who had been made non-corporeal by an ancient curse hundreds of years ago, and who is now able to wander through time at will.  When Sahjhan uncovered a prophecy that he would be killed by ‘the one sired by a vampire with a soul’ he brought vampire hunter and Angel's old nemesis Daniel Holtz to the 21st century to kill Angel, Darla and the baby.  However, Holtz did not follow Sahjhan's plan, so Sahjhan, using his time-shifting abilities, altered the prophecy to trick Wesley into believing that Angel would kill Connor.

In the final confrontation, Angel makes Sahjhan corporeal once again to fight him, but discovers that he is more physically powerful than any of them had anticipated. Justine ends up trapping him in a special urn that Holtz had obtained previously.

Wesley is later found and taken to a hospital. Angel pays him a visit, saying he would never kill his own son. He tells Wesley it's important that he knows it's not Angelus talking, but Angel. When Wesley nods, Angel simply says "good" then suddenly grabs a pillow and tries to smother Wesley with it. Filled with fury and rage, Angel screams that he will never forgive his former friend, and that he'll kill him for stealing his son. An alarm is tripped, and Angel is dragged away by Gunn and some orderlies. As he is pulled away, Angel maniacally screams death threats at Wesley, screaming:"You're a dead man, Pryce! You're dead! Dead!"

Production

Acting
Charisma Carpenter does not appear in this episode, despite featuring in the title credits.

Arc significance
Angel's search for redemption seems to have taken a back seat as he seeks vengeance on Holtz and Wolfram & Hart for conspiring to kidnap his son.  His relationships with the other members of his team begin to fall apart.
The bonds of trust and friendship that have developed between Angel and Wesley over the years are violently severed when Angel doesn't forgive Wesley for what he has done, and then attempts to murder him.

Continuity
This episode is the first that features the "White Room."  It is described as an interdimensional gateway.  It will play a significant role in the next two seasons.

External links

 

Angel (season 3) episodes
2002 American television episodes